The foreign policy of the Netherlands is based on four basic commitments: to the Atlantic cooperation, to European integration, to international development and to international law. While historically the Kingdom of the Netherlands was a neutral state, since 1945 it has become a member of NATO, the United Nations, the European Union and many other international organizations. The Dutch economy is very open and relies on international trade. During and after the 17th century—its Golden Age—the Dutch built up a commercial and colonial empire. It was a leading shipping and naval power and was often at war with England, its main rival. Its main colonial holding was Indonesia, which fought for and achieved independence after 1945. The historical ties inherited from its colonial past still influence the foreign relations of the Netherlands.  Foreign trade policy is handled by the European Union.  The Dutch have been active in international peacekeeping roles.

History

In the Dutch Golden Age, which had its zenith around 1667, there was a flowering of trade, industry, the arts and the sciences. A rich worldwide Dutch empire developed and the Dutch East India Company became one of the earliest and most important of national mercantile companies based on entrepreneurship and trade.

During the 18th century, the power and wealth of the Netherlands declined. A series of wars with the more powerful British and French neighbors weakened it. Britain seized the North American colony of New Amsterdam, turning it into New York. There was growing unrest and conflict between the Orangists and the Patriots. The French Revolution spilled over after 1789, and a pro-French Batavian Republic was established in 1795–1806. Napoleon made it a satellite state, the Kingdom of Holland (1806–1810), and later simply a French imperial province.

In 1815–1940 it was neutral and played a minor role in world diplomacy, apart from a failed effort to control the seceding Southern provinces that became Belgium before giving up in 1839.

Unlike most European countries, the Netherlands succeeded in remaining neutral throughout The Great War. This approach failed during the Second World War however and the kingdom quickly fell to an unprovoked German invasion in 1940 and would remain under Nazi occupation until being liberated by the allies in 1945. After the war, as a member of the allies, the Netherlands was included in the first class of U.N. members. During the Cold War like most Western European countries, the Dutch aligned with the United States against the Soviet Union, co-founding the North Atlantic Treaty Organization (NATO), in 1949. The Dutch were also at the forefront of promoting European cooperation and integration during this time period; co-founding the European Coal and Steel Community and becoming one of the European Union's (EU) original members.

Policy

The Dutch Government conducted a review of foreign policy main themes, organization, and funding in 1995. The document "The Foreign Policy of the Netherlands: A Review" outlined the new direction of Dutch foreign policy. The Netherlands prioritizes enhancing European integration, maintaining relations with neighboring states, ensuring European security and stability (mainly through the mechanism of NATO and emphasizing the important role the United States plays in the security of Europe), and participating in conflict management and peacekeeping missions. The foreign policy review also resulted in the reorganization of the Ministry of Foreign Affairs. Through the creation of regional departments, the Ministry coordinates tasks previously divided among the international cooperation, foreign affairs, and economic affairs sections.

Atlantic cooperation

Dutch security policy is based primarily on membership in NATO. Because of Dutch participation in NATO, nuclear weapons are stationed in the Netherlands, see Volkel Air Base.

The Dutch also pursue defense cooperation within Europe, both multilaterally – in the context of the Western European Union and the European Security and Defence Policy of the EU – and bilaterally, as in the German-Netherlands Corps. In recent years, the Dutch have become significant contributors to UN peacekeeping efforts around the world as well as to the Stabilization Force in Bosnia and Herzegovina (SFOR) in Bosnia.

European integration
The Dutch have been strong advocates of European integration, and most aspects of their foreign, economic, and trade policies are coordinated through the European Union (EU). The Dutch postwar customs union with Belgium and Luxembourg (the Benelux group) paved the way for the formation of the European Community (precursor to the EU), of which the Netherlands was a founding member. Likewise, the Benelux abolition of internal border controls was a model for the wider Schengen Accord, which today has 29 European signatories (including the Netherlands) pledged to common visa policies and free movement of people across common borders.

The Dutch stood at the cradle of the 1992 Maastricht Treaty and have been the architects of the Treaty of Amsterdam concluded in 1998. The Dutch have thus played an important role in European political and monetary integration; indeed, until the year 2003, Dutchman Wim Duisenberg headed the European Central Bank. In addition, Dutch financial minister Gerrit Zalm was the main critic of the violation of the Stability and Growth Pact by France and Germany in 2004 and 2005.

Involvement in Developing Countries

The Netherlands is among the world's leading aid donors, giving almost $8  billion, about 0.8% of its gross national income (GNI) in official development assistance (ODA). It is one of five countries worldwide that meets the longstanding UN ODA target of 0.7% ODA/GNI.  The country consistently contributes large amounts of aid through multilateral channels, especially the United Nations Development Programme, the international financial institutions, and EU programs. A large portion of Dutch aid funds also is channeled through private ("co-financing") organizations that have almost total autonomy in choice of projects.

The Netherlands is a member of the European Bank for Reconstruction and Development, which recently initiated economic reforms in central Europe. The Dutch strongly support the Middle East peace process and in 1998 earmarked $29  million in contributions to international donor-coordinated activities for the occupied territories and also for projects in which they worked directly with Palestinian authorities. These projects included improving environmental conditions and support for multilateral programs in cooperation with local non-governmental organizations. In 1998, the Dutch provided significant amounts of aid to the former Yugoslavia and Africa. The Dutch consistently provide significant amounts of humanitarian relief aid to the victims of the worst natural disasters, such as the Hurricane Mitch in Central America in 1998, 2004 Indian Ocean earthquake and tsunami in South and Southeast Asia, the Hurricane Katrina in the United States in 2005, 2010 Haiti earthquake, and more recent catastrophes in Pakistan and Burma including the Typhoon Haiyan in the Philippines in 2013, and 2015 Nepal earthquake.

On 25 April 2022, Vice Minister Schuiling visited Vietnam for promotion of economic cooperation between Netherlands and Vietnam including the sectors like agriculture, water, logistics, energy and high tech.

Export assistance grants
"Developing countries aspiring to purchase foreign goods and services to invest in, inter alia, port facilities, roads, public transport, health care, or drinking water facilities may be eligible for a special Dutch grant facility. The grant facility, known as ORET (a Dutch acronym for Ontwikkelingsrelevante Exporttransacties, or Development-Related Export) serves to award grants to governments of developing countries for making payments to foreign suppliers."

International law

A centuries-old tradition of legal scholarship has made the Netherlands the home of the International Court of Justice; the Iran-United States Claims Tribunal; the International Criminal Tribunal for the former Yugoslavia; the International Criminal Tribunal for Rwanda; and the International Criminal Court (ICC). In addition it hosts the European police organization, Europol; and the Organisation for the Prohibition of Chemical Weapons.

International organizations

As a relatively small country, the Netherlands generally pursues its foreign policy interests within the framework of multilateral organizations. The Netherlands is an active and responsible participant in the United Nations system as well as other multilateral organizations such as the Organization for Security and Cooperation in Europe, Organisation for Economic Co-operation and Development (OECD), World Trade Organization (WTO), and International Monetary Fund.

The Netherlands is one of the founding members of what today is the European Union. It was one of the first countries to start European integration, through the Benelux in 1944 and the European Coal and Steel Community in 1952. Being a small country with a history of neutrality it was the host country for the important Maastricht Treaty and Amsterdam Treaty and is the seat of the International Court of Justice.

International issues

The country is one of the major producers of illicit amphetamines and other synthetic drugs. It also functions as an important gateway for cocaine, heroin, and hashish entering Europe. A large portion of the world's XTC consumption is supplied by illegal laboratories from the Netherlands.

The Dutch also work with the U.S. and other countries on international programs against drug trafficking and organized crime. The Dutch-U.S. cooperation focuses on joint anti-drug operations in the Caribbean, including an agreement establishing Forward Operating Locations on the Dutch Kingdom islands of Curaçao and Aruba. The Netherlands is a signatory to international counter-narcotics agreements, a member of the United Nations International Drug Control Program, the UN Commission on Narcotic Drugs, and is a contributor to international counter-narcotics.

From June 26 until December 22, 2006, two children, Ammar (12–13) and Sara (10–11), lived in the Dutch embassy in Damascus because of a child custody dispute between the Dutch mother, supported by Dutch law and the Hague Convention on the Civil Aspects of International Child Abduction, and the Syrian father, supported by Syrian law (Syria is no participant of this convention). The children had been living in Syria since 2004, after an alleged international child abduction by the father from the Netherlands to Syria, during a family contact in which he supposedly would visit Paris with them. The children fled to the embassy because they would like to live with their mother in the Netherlands. Minister of Foreign Affairs Ben Bot traveled to Damascus, negotiated and on December 22 the children finally could return to the Netherlands.

The father claims that the Dutch government has promised not to prosecute him for the abduction. However, a Dutch prosecutor claims that he is free to prosecute the father and may well do that and that the Dutch have only retracted the international request to arrest him outside the Netherlands.

Mark Rutte's government provided materials to the Levant Front rebel group in Syria. In September 2018, the Dutch public prosecution department declared the Levant Front to be a "criminal organisation of terrorist intent", describing it as a "salafist and jihadistic" group that "strives for the setting up of the caliphate".

In July 2019, the UN ambassadors from 22 nations, including the Netherlands, signed a joint letter to the UNHRC condemning China's mistreatment of the Uyghurs as well as its mistreatment of other minority groups, urging the Chinese government to close the Xinjiang re-education camps.

Former colonies
The Caribbean islands of Aruba, Curaçao, Sint Maarten, Bonaire, Sint Eustatius and Saba are dependencies of the Netherlands. The latter three are part of the Netherlands proper and are collectively known as the Caribbean Netherlands. Suriname and Indonesia became independent of the Netherlands in the period of decolonization: Suriname in 1975 and Indonesia in 1945 (it was not until August 16, 2005, that the Dutch government recognized 1945 and not 1949 as the latter's year of independence).

Bilateral relations

Africa

Americas

Asia

Europe

Oceania

See also
 List of diplomatic missions in the Netherlands
 List of diplomatic missions of the Netherlands

Notes

Further reading
 Collet, Steven. "Modernizing the Dutch Diplomatic Service: A Work in Progress." The Hague Journal of Diplomacy 10.4 (2015): 440–451.
 Israel, Jonathan. The Dutch Republic: Its Rise, Greatness, and Fall, 1477–1806 (1995) a major synthesis; complete online edition; also excerpt and text search
 Koopmans, Joop W., and Arend H. Huussen Jr. Historical Dictionary of the Netherlands (2nd ed. 2007)excerpt and text search
 Kossmann, E. H. The Low Countries 1780–1940 (1978) 790pp. 
 Krabbendam, Hans, et al. eds. Four Centuries of Dutch-American Relations 1609–2009 (Amsterdam: Boom), 2009, 1190 pp., ; excerpt
 Leurdijk, J.H. ed. The Foreign Policy of the Netherlands (Alphen aan den Rijn, 1978).
 Nordholt, Jan Willem Schulte, and Robert P. Swierenga. Bilateral Bicentennial: A History of Dutch-American Relations, 1782–1982 (1982) 279pp
 
 Scott, Cynthia. "Renewing the ‘Special Relationship’and Rethinking the Return of Cultural Property: The Netherlands and Indonesia, 1949–79." Journal of Contemporary History 52.3 (2017): 646–668.
 Tuyll van Serooskerken, Hubert P. van. Netherlands & World War I: Espionage, Diplomacy & Survival (2001) 381p. 
 van Willigen, Niels. "A Dutch return to UN peacekeeping?." International Peacekeeping 23.5 (2016): 702–720.
 Vandenbosch, Amry. Dutch Foreign Policy since 1815 (1959). online; online free to borrow
 Vandenbosch, Amry. The neutrality of the Netherlands during the world war (1927).
 Vandenbosch, Amry. Dutch in the Far East (1943) online
 Veer, Lionel. "On the road for human rights: Experiences and reflections of the Dutch human rights ambassador 2010–2014." Netherlands Quarterly of Human Rights 35.1 (2017): 4–10.